Edinaldo Batista dos Santos, or simply Edinaldo (born April 2, 1987), is a Brazilian midfielder. He last played for Mito HollyHock in the J2 League.

Club statistics

References

External links

1987 births
Living people
Brazilian footballers
Brazilian expatriate footballers
J2 League players
Mito HollyHock players
Expatriate footballers in Japan
Association football forwards